Lyndon John Farnham is a Jersey politician who is the Deputy Chief Minister and Minister for Economic Development, Tourism, Sport and Culture. He used to be a Deputy for St Saviour, and is now a Senator. He is a businessman and a company director.

Political career
He was first elected to the States in 1999 as one of the Deputies for St Saviour's No. 2 District. He was re-elected in 2002 and stood down in 2005. 

He returned to the States' chamber in 2011, this time as a Senator, being sworn to office on 14 November that same year. 

He was re-elected in October 2014 and 2018.

He is Jersey's Deputy Chief Minister and its Minister for Economic Development.

Electoral reform
Farnham led the campaign to retain the office of Senator, supporting Option C in the Jersey electoral reform referendum held on 24 April 2013.

Business career

He is a company director and a past president of the Jersey Hospitality Association, and a former chairman of the Jersey Battle of Flowers Association.

References

External links
 
 Lyndon Farnham on vote.je

Living people
Senators of Jersey
Deputies of Jersey
People educated at Hautlieu School
Jersey businesspeople
Year of birth missing (living people)
Government ministers of Jersey